Vipperow is a village and a former municipality in the Mecklenburgische Seenplatte district, in Mecklenburg-Vorpommern, Germany. Since May 2019, it is part of the new municipality Südmüritz.

References 

Former municipalities in Mecklenburg-Western Pomerania